The juniper gelechiid moth (Gelechia sabinellus) is a moth of the family Gelechiidae. It is known from most of Europe. It is an introduced species in Great Britain and North America through accidental introduction in garden junipers.

The wingspan is 15–18 mm. Adults are on wing in August.

The larvae feed on Juniperus species, including Juniperus communis.

Subspecies
Gelechia sabinellus sabinellus
Gelechia sabinellus corsella Rebel, 1930 (Corsica)

References

Gelechia
Moths of Europe
Moths described in 1839
Insects of Turkey